Alexander Lindsay (13 February 1883 — 26 January 1941) was a Scottish first-class cricketer and merchant.

Lindsay was born in February 1883 at Broughty Ferry. He was educated at Fettes College. A club cricketer for Forfarshire Cricket Club, he made a single appearance in first-class cricket for Scotland against the touring Australians at Edinburgh in 1909. Batting twice in the match, he was dismissed for 7 runs in the Scottish first innings by Jack O'Connor, while in their second innings he was dismissed without scoring by Bill Whitty. He also bowled two overs of leg break googly bowling, going wicketless. Lindsay later captained Forfarshire to the Scottish Counties Championship in 1920. Outside of cricket, he was a merchant and was a director of Lindsay and Low, Ltd, a confectionery and preserves manufacturer. Lindsay died at a nursing home in Dundee in January 1941.

References

External links
 

1883 births
1941 deaths
People from Broughty Ferry
People educated at Fettes College
Scottish cricketers
Scottish merchants
20th-century Scottish businesspeople